Li Xiaohong (born June 1959) is a Chinese engineer and educator, and the current President of the Chinese Academy of Engineering (CAE). He served as the president of Chongqing University from 2003 to 2010, and was appointed as the president of Wuhan University in 2010. In 2011, he was elected as a member of the CAE. As a researcher, Li's main interests are in the field of mining engineering. He made contributions to the development of water jet cutters in China, and established new equations about jet parameters and cutting effection, so the use of abrasive jet could be improved.

Life and career
Li was born into a rural family; he once served as a commune cadre in 1975. In 1978, he entered the Mining Engineering Department, Chongqing University, and was appointed as the party secretary of the department after he graduated in 1982. From June 1989, he trained at UC Berkeley for 3 years. In 1993, he received his doctor's degree in engineering from Chongqing University. Then he served as a visiting scholar at UQ from March to August 1996. Li later served as the dean of College of Resources and Environmental Engineering, Chongqing University, from 1994 to 1998. He served as the president of Chongqing University from 2003 to 2010, and the president of Wuhan University from 2010 to 2016.

Research
Li began to develop Water Jet TBM Tunneling Machine when trained at UC Berkeley. There, he spent two years to make the machine capable of crushing stones which are extremely hard. He continued this research after he returned to Chongqing University. He finally developed a method of rock crushing, containing eroding coal rock with water jet, crack extension, washing away the debris, and cooling the cutting-tools.

Li and his colleagues studied the mechanism of abrasive mixing in self-oscillation flow, and measured its effects on main parameters, so they could develop the equations about jet parameters and cutting effection. Consequently, they could infer the relation between characteristics of wear particles and effect of cavitation in pulsed abrasive water jet. Based on this, they proposed a design standard of pulsed abrasive water jet nozzles.

References

1959 births
Living people
Engineers from Chongqing
Members of the Chinese Academy of Engineering
Educators from Chongqing
Presidents of Wuhan University
Academic staff of Chongqing University
Chongqing University alumni
Members of the 19th Central Committee of the Chinese Communist Party